The Mind of the Married Man is a television series that ran on the HBO network for two seasons consisting of twenty episodes between September 2001 and November 2002. The story focused on the challenges of modern-day married life from a male perspective.

The theme song was the title song of the musical I Love My Wife (1977), written by Cy Coleman and Michael Stewart.

Cast
 Mike Binder as Micky Barnes
 Sonya Walger as Donna Barnes
 Ivana Miličević as Missy
 Jake Weber as Jake Berman
 M. Emmet Walsh as Randall Evans
 Taylor Nichols as Doug Nelson
 Doug Williams as Kevin
 Bobby Slayton as Slayton
 Brigitte Bako as Bianca
 Kate Walsh as Carol Nelson

Reception
The Mind Of The Married Man received mixed-to-negative reviews. Ken Tucker of Entertainment Weekly rated it the worst show on television in 2002, calling it "Mike Binder's rancid little barf-com" and described it as more offensive than similar shows on other non-subscription networks "because it could be more explicit in its moronic sexism". Phil Gallo in Variety described it as an "overblown take on the sexual predilections and peccadilloes of a trio of ribald Chicago newspaper columnists" and that while it aspired to be "a male Sex and the City, it does not have any of that show’s strengths — character, plot, reality." In a marginally more positive review, Julie Salamon of The New York Times said Married Man wants to copy Sex and the City, but it isn't nearly as deft or surprising and "adheres to many sitcom clichés", yet is "cleverly produced and compelling in part because its characters are so annoying (and so close to certain truths). Women especially will enjoy feeling superior to these sad souls with their pathetic dreams."

HBO cancelled the show after 20 episodes over two seasons. According to Carolyn Strauss, who was the executive vice president of program development for HBO at the time, "Mind turned out to be a divisive show within households [...] Women wouldn't watch it, so husbands didn't watch it with their wives, and boyfriends didn't with their girlfriends."

In a 2011 retrospective review, Metro called it "outdated" and that it "looked as though it could have been straight out of the early 1990s. Everything from the boxy jackets to the less-than-perfect visual quality of the filming looked oddly old-fashioned." The review added, "Although it had its funny moments, the writing wasn’t snappy enough to compensate for all of this."

Episodes

Season 1 (2001)

Season 2 (2002)

References

External links
 
 

HBO original programming
2001 American television series debuts
2002 American television series endings
2000s American comedy-drama television series
English-language television shows
Television shows set in Chicago